Ioannis Demertzis (alternate spellings: Giannis, Yiannis) (Greek: Γιάννης Δεμερτζης; born July 20, 1983) is a Greek professional basketball player. He is 1.96 m (6 ft 5 in) tall.

Professional career
After playing youth basketball with Mantoulidis, Demertzis started his pro playing career in 2005, in the Greek 2nd Division, playing with ICBS. In 2006, he moved to Iraklis, where he stayed only for one year. In 2007, he moved to PAOK Thessaloniki, where he stayed until 2010. He has also played with Marousi, Keravnos, Ikaros Kallitheas, Ethnikos Piraeus and Kavala.

He then moved to Holargos, but left the team without making any appearances in order to join the newly-promoted Doxa Lefkadas of the Greek Basket League.

In 2018, he joined Apollon Patras.
In 2019-2020 he moved to Harilaos Trikoupis B.C.,making a good season.In 2020-2021 season he moved to Keravnos (Aghios Pavlos-Thessaloniki) B.C. Due to the COVID-19 pandemic, the league never started. In July 2021, he signed for Navarchos Votsis (Thessaloniki) B.C.

References

External links
FIBA Europe Profile
Draftexpress.com Profile
Eurobasket.com Profile
RealGM.com Profile
Greek Basket League Profile 

1983 births
Living people
Charilaos Trikoupis B.C. players
Doxa Lefkadas B.C. players
ICBS B.C. players
Larisa B.C. players
Greek men's basketball players
Greek Basket League players
Iraklis Thessaloniki B.C. players
Kavala B.C. players
P.A.O.K. BC players
Point guards
Shooting guards
Small forwards
Basketball players from Thessaloniki